Ilya Alexandrovich Dolgov (born 1984, in Voronezh), is a Russian artist.

Biography 
Ilya Dolgov was born in Voronezh in 1984. In 2001 to 2006 he studied Philosophy and Psychology at the Voronezh State University (thesis “Emotional Perception of Messages with Dysfunctional Aesthetic Structure”). In 2009, he was an external student at The Institute of Contemporary Art (ICA Moscow).

In the years 2004–5, Dolgov was involved in the Voronezh-based artistic groups Border Investigations together with co-members Arseny Zhilyaev, Maria Chekhonadskikh, Nikolay Alekseev, Ivan Gorshkov and Alexander Sinozersky and Popular Border Investigations.
In 2008, together with Nikolay Alekseev, Ivan Gorshkov and Arseny Zhilyaev, he co-founded the Voronezh Center of Contemporary Art (VCCA).
Dolgov’s first solo show took place at the “Energiya” Sport Center, a venue of VCCA. It was titled Utopia Is What You Need But You Is Not What Utopia Has Need For and demonstrated Dolgov’s interest in the “contemporary utopian project of trans-humanism, the optics of utopian desire and the subjectivities it derives from”.

 In 2009, Dolgov’s debuted as a curator with the exhibition Can’t Take It Anymore, also at the VCCA, dedicated to the semantic and visual strategies of contemporary artists working with painting and graphic mediums.
In 2010–2011, together with Nikolay Alekseev, Ilya Dolgov was nominated for the Innovation Prize, the all-Russian competition in the field of contemporary arts in the Regional Project of the Year category (Innovation VI: exhibition Live Museum of Performance, VCCA, 2010; Innovation VII: exhibition Utopia Ruins, H.L.A.M. Gallery, 2011).

In 2012, Dolgov presented his project Herbarium for the first time at the H.L.A.M. Gallery, Voronezh, which included graphic work, installations made of reed, cane and moss, as well as video documentation of nature in its stereotypical vision. The graphic series depicted a re-drawn herbarium, collected at the Grafsky reserve under Voronezh in 1998 with the index of the class and order categories attached. In this project, the artist investigated the human perception of nature, the relations between an individual and nature, observes the expansion of the plant world and, in the installation of cane cubes, designs the invasion of the space by the plants. That same year, the project won the 2012 Innovation Prize in the Regional Contemporary Art Project nomination. Dolgov continued to collect and draw plants afterwards, so that the later versions of the Herbarium exhibition feature works executed in 2012 and later, as well as more recent installation pieces. 
In 2013, at the Moscow State University’s Zoological Museum in collaboration with Gallery 21 Ilya Dolgov presented his first personal exhibition in Moscow. In the Azoic project, the artist continued his investigation of the limits of relations between man, nature and machines. Here, Dolgov models a system of interconnections between imaginary creatures—chimeras—unveiling the ties inherent in the modern world, basing on the concept of Azoy as “an ancient period in the history of the Earth, where there were no organisms, machines and humans, while the planet was inhabited by the Azoyids. In those creatures, the biological, the technological and the cultural had not yet divided into separate ways of being”. Using video, graphic works, scientific atlases and various other objects as his materials, Dolgov invents some of the chimeric Azoyids, but also discovers them in the everydayness (e.g. a water cart, a flowerbed, a carrier, a group of teenage traceurs in a concrete box, or a technology that takes care of the animals on a farm). In 2013 the project was nominated for the Kandinsky Prize—a national award in the field of contemporary art in the “Young Artist. Project of the Year” category.

His next nomination for the Kandinsky Prize came in 2015 in the same category, for the installation Model of Nature, Goethe’s Model exhibited at the XL Gallery in Moscow. In this piece, the artist concentrated on the interrelations between man and nature through the works of Goethe. The narrative was taken from Dolgov long-time ongoing online project “Forest Journal”, meanwhile hexagons as a form of “overgrowing” derived from D’Arcy Thompson’s theory of mathematical biology. 

Since 2013, Ilya Dolgov has been working on his creative research Internet project “Forest Journal”  focusing on nature and the attempts to understand, observe and describe it on a new level. Making a forest, wasteland, a meadow, a field, a coomb and a fowl-farm his subject matter, the author of the idea, Dolgov, in cooperation with Alex Buldakov, Ilya Romanov, Ivan Gorshkov, Zhanna Dolgova, Anastasiya Taylakova, Elizaveta Konovalova and Lukas Corte, through observation and sensual perception is aiming to answer the key question in each of the bimonthly issues: “What is nature?” In the artist’s own words,  “Forest Journal” is an attempt to make two steps back in the exploration of the world, in order to re-define it in a novel way. I’m employing the old-fashioned approach of a natural philosopher, an enthusiastic amateur natural scientist. Each of the issues is dedicated to one theme and includes texts, photographs, video, documentation of natural processes, and other materials. 

Ilya Dolgov currently lives and works in Kronstadt, under St Petersburg. His is married to Zhanna Dolgova, also an artist, member of the Lisichki Collective artistic group.

Exhibitions 
2016 —  Herbarium, Peresvetov Lane Gallery, Moscow 

2013 – 2016 — Forest Journal, online research project, Forestjournal.org

2015 —  Model of Nature, Goethe’s Model, XL Gallery, Moscow
2014 —  Azoikum, Büro für kulturelle Übersetzungen, Leipzig, Germany

2013 —  Azoic, MSU Zoological Museum, in collaboration with Gallery 21

2012 — Herbarium, H.L.A.M. Gallery, Voronezh

2009 — Utopia Is What You Need But You Is Not What Utopia Has Need For, VCCA, Voronezh 

2016 — Badlands, Zarya Center for Contemporary Art, Vladivostok

2016 — Constructing the Future: Children’s Books of the 1920–1930s, Russian State Children’s Library, Moscow

2016 — Достояние. Естество, Victoria Gallery 

2016 —  В славном городе Воронеже, WINZAVOD Center for Contemporary Art (together with VCCA), Moscow (as part of the 5th Moscow International Biennale for Young Art)

2016 —  Experiences of the Imaginary, New Holland: Cultural Urbanization, St Petersburg 

2016 —  Living Alive, National Center for Contemporary Arts (NCCA), Volgo-Vyatsky branch, Nizhny Novgorod 

2015 —  Open Space Observations, Divnogorie Museum, Voronezh Region 

2014 —  Not Museum, Manifesta 10, Parallel Program, St Petersburg 
2014 —  One Place Next to Another, WINZAVOD Center for Contemporary Art, Moscow

2014 —  Detective, MMOMA, Moscow 
2014 —  11, Garage Center for Contemporary Art, Moscow

2014 —  Catch a Tortoise, Krasnodar Institute of Contemporary Art (KISS), Krasnodar

2014 —  Beauty of Unattractiveness, Belyaevo Gallery, Moscow
2013 —  Revisiting the Space, Voronezh, VCCA, Voronezh

2013 —  No Water Tomorrow, MMOMA, Moscow 

2013 —  Space Lab, Spinnerei, Leipzig, Germany 

2012 —  Behind the Encounter Scenes, Gallery 21, Moscow
2012 —  Awaiting Environment, Gallery 21, Moscow

2012 —  Strategic Project of the III Moscow International Biennale of Young Art, 

2011 —  From the Field of Practical Knowledge, GMG Gallery, Moscow 

2011 —  Utopia Ruins, H.L.A.M. Gallery, Voronezh

2011 —  The Phantom Monuments, Garage Center for Contemporary The Phantom Monuments, Moscow
2011 —  Forms of Rationales, H.L.A.M. Gallery, Voronezh

2010 —  Live Museum of Performance, VCCA, Voronezh

2010 — The Only Difference, Fabrika Project, Moscow

2010 —  Taming Time, Fabrika Project, Moscow

2010 —  Foundations, VCCA, Voronezh

2009 —  The Next Step Is Ours!, VCCA, Voronezh

2009 —  “Care” Land Art Festival, Divnogorie reserve, VCCA, Voronezh

2009 —  Genius Loci: Gallery, Ravenscourt Galleries, Moscow

2009 —  Universam Art Fair, Moscow

2009 —  Care, Armyansky 13, Moscow

2009 —  Can’t Take It Anymore, VCCA, Voronezh
2004 – 5 —  Participant of the Border Investigations and Popular Border Investigations art groups, Voronezh. Projects “Magical Transformations”, “Unconditional Reflex”, “The Party”, “Naked Lunch of Bonaventura’s Father” and the  “Kingdom of the Soft-Bodied”.

2013 —  Bestiary (together with Nikolay Alekseev), VCCA, Voronezh

2011 —  Utopia Ruins (together with Nikolay Alekseev), H.L.A.M. Gallery, Voronezh

2010 —  Live Museum of Performance, VCCA, Voronezh

2009 —  Can’t Take It Anymore, VCCA, Voronezh

2012 —  Innovation Prize nominee in the Regional Project of Contemporary Art category (the Herbarium project)

2013 —  Winner of Garage Museum’s grant program 

2016 —  Credit Suisse Award and Cosmoscow Award winner for young artists.

In 2015, Dolgov was made it in the shortlist of Russia’s seven most perspective young artists, according to Forbes Russia, especially attractive for local and foreign museums, exhibitions and collectors.

In 2016 he made it to list of the most notable young Russian artists, according to Art Newspaper Russia.

In 2016, Ilya Dolgov quit the judging panel of the Innovation Prize, in protest against the exclusion of Petr Pavlensky from the competition

Web-cite 
Official website

VCCA

Ilya Dolgov on Aroundart.ru 

Ilya Dolgov on the official website of the Kandinsky Prize

Sources 

Living people
1984 births
Russian artists